Arpit Gawri, better known by his stage name 32Stitches, is a Mumbai-based electronic musician, record producer and DJ. His music has been released on labels such as Universal Music, Trap Nation, NoCopyrightSounds, Sony Music and Music High Court.

Early life and career
Born in Chandigarh, Arpit studied at ILM Academy. He obtained his second audio engineering degree from Point Blank Music School in London. Following that, he made his initial performances in London, Amsterdam and Mumbai. He made his debut with Sony Music with the release of "Last Time" in 2016, and also co-founded his own record label and live experience brand Music High Court.

In 2017, he performed alongside San Holo and Droeloe at their debut show in India, and also performed at the Run the Trap showcase in Mumbai along with Fabian Mazur and LUUDE later that year, along with a debut show at Amsterdam Dance Event After Party the same year.

Performances

Discography

References

Indian DJs
Musicians from Chandigarh
Future bass musicians
Electronic dance music DJs
Trap musicians (EDM)